New Lives for Old is a 1925 American silent drama film that was produced by Famous Players-Lasky, directed by Clarence G. Badger, and starred Betty Compson.

Plot
As described in a film magazine review, Olympe (Compson), a famous dancer, throws herself into the service of France when her country calls during World War I. She saves an American battalion from destruction when their plans are disclosed to German spies. She is wrongly judged for her work and is disgraced in the eyes of her audience. Having sacrificed her reputation for her country, she marries an American army officer and they sail for the United States.

Cast

Preservation
With no prints of New Lives for Old located in any film archives, it is a lost film.

References

External links

Still with Betty Compson and Margaret Seddon at silentfilmstillarchive.com

1925 films
American silent feature films
Films directed by Clarence G. Badger
Lost American films
Paramount Pictures films
1925 drama films
Silent American drama films
American black-and-white films
1925 lost films
Lost drama films
1920s American films